The Toledo Bullfrogs was to be a professional arena football team based at the Lucas County Arena in Toledo, Ohio. They were scheduled to begin play in the af2, the developmental league of the Arena Football League, in 2010, until that league folded in 2009. The team never played a game and the Toledo Bullfrogs website now leads directly to the Toledo Walleye website.

History
On September 22, 2008, Toledo Arena Sports, Inc. (a non-profit group led by the owners of the International League's Toledo Mud Hens which also owns the ECHL's Toledo Walleye), announced that an af2 franchise was coming to the arena.

On November 18, the Bullfrogs announced their name, logo, and colors.  The name was chosen as an homage to the city sitting on what was formerly the Great Black Swamp, ergo, when the city was founded, there was a frog infestation.  This heritage is also immortalized in the Lucas County Courthouse and Jail, where a frog is depicted in the floor mosaic.

References

External links
 Toledo Bullfrogs

Defunct af2 teams
Sports teams in Toledo, Ohio
Defunct American football teams in Ohio
American football teams established in 2008
American football teams disestablished in 2009
2008 establishments in Ohio
2009 disestablishments in Ohio